Montfavergier is a former municipality in the district of Franches-Montagnes in the canton of Jura in Switzerland.  On 1 January 2009 the former municipality of Montfavergier merged into Montfaucon.

References

Former municipalities of the canton of Jura